Major General Ajith Wickramasinghe RSP, USP, psc, is the Director General Supply and Transport of the Sri Lanka Army.

Early life
Wickramasinghe was educated at Nalanda College Colombo. While at school he played cricket and represented Nalanda College first XI at Ananda-Nalanda Battle of the Maroons annual cricketing encounter.

References

 With Impressive Records, Curtains Come Down on 'Army Para Games'
 SL Light Infantry Take Honours In Successful Games
 Rise of Sri Lanka Army Cricket Wins three titles in-a-row

Sri Lankan Buddhists
Sri Lankan major generals
Sinhalese military personnel
Alumni of Nalanda College, Colombo
Sri Lanka Military Academy graduates
Living people
Year of birth missing (living people)